Gilliard's bird-of-paradise  is a bird in the family Paradisaeidae that is a hybrid between a raggiana bird-of-paradise and lesser bird-of-paradise.  It is known from adult male specimens taken in the upper Baiyer Valley in Papua New Guinea.  It was named after American ornithologist Ernest Thomas Gilliard by Clifford Frith and Bruce Beehler.

Notes

References
 

Paradisaea
Hybrid birds of paradise
Birds of Papua New Guinea